David 'Dave' Noble (born 1965) is an Australian Canyoner, Explorer and Botanist who on or about 10 September 1994 discovered the Wollemi pine. Thus, resulting in the scientific name of this species, Wollemia nobilis, is named after him.

John and Olive Noble, David's parents, emigrated from England to Australia when he was two years old.

A modern-day explorer, Noble has visited sites in the Wollemi National Park that few if any other people have seen and is known for exploring the canyons of the Wollemi Wilderness.  He has named over two hundred remote features, including the canyons: Twister, Hole in the Wall, Surefire and Tiger Snake. At the time of discovering the Wollemi pine, Noble was a field officer with the National Parks and Wildlife Service (New South Wales). After his discovery Noble completed a bachelor of applied science degree and was promoted to a ranger.

References

External links
 David Noble's home page, from the Internet Archive

1965 births
Explorers of Australia
Living people
Australian people of English descent
Australian conservationists
20th-century Australian botanists
21st-century Australian botanists